Severe Tropical Cyclone Martin was the deadliest tropical cyclone of the 1997–98 South Pacific cyclone season. The system was first noted as a weak tropical disturbance on October 27, to the north of the Northern Cook Islands. Over the next few days atmospheric convection surrounding the system remained disorganized, as it moved towards the southwest and was affected by strong upper-level north-easterly winds and moderate to strong vertical wind shear. The system was subsequently named Martin during October 31, after it had rapidly developed further and shown a marked improvement organization.

Meteorological history

During October 27, the Fiji Meteorological Service (FMS) started to monitor a weak tropical disturbance, that had developed to the north of the Northern Cook Islands. At this stage, the systems weak low-level circulation was moving to the west-southwest, while atmospheric convection surrounding the disturbance was unorganized and being impacted by strong upper-level northeasterly winds. Over the next three days, the system only slightly improved its organization, as moved south-southwest and was impacted by moderate to strong vertical wind shear. During October 30, the United States Naval Pacific Meteorology and Oceanography Center (NPMOC) initiated advisories on the system and designated it as Tropical Cyclone 04P, before it started to rapidly develop and show marked signs of improved organisation during the following day. As a result of this rapid development, the FMS reported during October 31, that the system had become developed into a category 1 tropical cyclone on the Australian tropical cyclone intensity scale and named it Martin.

After it had been named, Martin continued to intensify and started to move south-southeastwards, as it recurved in response to an intensifying mid-tropospheric westerly flow. Over the next couple of days, the system moved south-eastwards towards a weakness in the upper-level subtropical ridge of high pressure and intensified into a category 3 severe tropical cyclone with hurricane-force winds during November 1. During November 3, as the system passed near or over the Society Islands of Bellingshausen, Mopelia and Scilly, the FMS reported that Martin had peaked as a Category 3 severe tropical cyclone, with 10-minute sustained wind speeds of 155 km/h (100 mph). Later that day, the NPMOC reported that the system had peaked with 1-minute sustained winds of 185 km/h (115 mph), which made it equivalent to a category 3 hurricane on the Saffir-Simpson hurricane wind scale. Martin subsequently started to gradually weaken, as it started to interact with a frontal system and transition into an extratropical cyclone.

Effects
Martin was one of the worst tropical cyclones to affect the South Pacific during the 20th century, as it caused significant damage and at least 28 deaths as it impacted the Northern Cook Islands and French Polynesia. As a result of the significant impacts, the name was later retired from the lists of tropical cyclone names for the region. Martin and its precursor tropical depression impacted the atolls of Pukapuka, Manihiki and Rakahanga, within the Northern Cook Islands between October 31 - November 2. The system then passed near or over French Polynesia's Society Islands during March 3.

Cook Islands

Pukapuka & Nassau
On the island, damage was reported to the hospital, post office, doctors and the homes of various government representatives, while authorities lost contact with the island at the height of the storm.

Manihiki

Martin devastated Manihiki in the Cook Islands. Almost every building on the island was destroyed by the storm surge, 10 people were killed, and 10 more persons reported missing and were later declared dead by the Cook Islands Coroner. 360 people were evacuated to Rarotonga, with most never returning. When the centre was closest to the island, the automatic weather station reported a lowest pressure of 994hPa, sustained winds of 20 m/s, and a highest gust of 29 m/s. However, this was the last meteorological report from the station before it was destroyed by storm surge. Within the Cook Islands, Martin was the deadliest known tropical cyclone to affect the Cook Islands in over a century, after it caused 19 deaths within the Islands.

Rakahanga
Several people were injured and up to 80% of the building on the atoll of Rakahanga were damaged

Aftermath
During November 2, after the Disaster Management Committee on Rarotonga received reports that the runway on Manihiki 
was intact, arrangements were made with Air Rarotonga for a plane to be sent to the atoll. The plane subsequently arrived in Manihiki with food and medical equipment, as well as a relief team consisting of two doctors, a communications technician, the Minister of Disaster Management: Tepure Tapaitau, as well as various other officials. The Cook Islands Government also formally requested assistance from the Government of New Zealand.

During November 3, the New Zealand Foreign Affairs Minister: Don McKinnon, received a request for Cook Islands Government. As a result, a Hercules from the Royal New Zealand Air Force would fly tarpaulins, water containers, blankets and communications equipment to Rarotonga, where food and medical supplies were added before it was dispatched to Manihiki.

French Polynesia

See also
Cyclone Namu
Cyclone Wasa–Arthur
List of off-season South Pacific tropical cyclones

References

External links

1997 in the Cook Islands
1997 in French Polynesia
Martin
Martin
Martin
Martin
Martin
Martin